The Savannah State Tigers basketball team represents Savannah State University and competes in NCAA Division II as a member of the Southern Intercollegiate Athletic Conference since July 2019. The Tigers play their home games in Tiger Arena on the university's Savannah, Georgia campus.

They are currently coached by Horace Broadnax who is in his 17th season as head coach of the Tigers.

They competed in NCAA Division I in the Mid-Eastern Athletic Conference from 2010–2019, but never qualified for the NCAA Division I Tournament. On April 17, 2017, the school announced that it would return to Division II due to financial issues associated with competing in Division I. On December 7, 2017, the school announced it would rejoin Division II's Southern Intercollegiate Athletic Conference (SIAC) following the 2018–19 academic year, pending NCAA approval.
Since joining the SIAC in the 2019-2020 academic year, the Tigers have won a SIAC Conference Championship (2021) and made a NCAA Division II National Tournament Appearance (2021).

History

Conference championships and NCAA playoffs

Prior to moving into the NCAA, the Tigers appeared in post season play in the NAIA collegiate level. The Tigers appeared in 3 NAIA National Men's Basketball National Tournaments in 1960, 1961, and 1962 with a total combined tournament record of 2–3.

Before moving to Division I the team won the Southern Intercollegiate Athletic Conference championship in 1970, 1979, 1980, and 1981.

The 1978–79 Tigers won an overtime game against Albany (NY) (82–81) in the first round of the NCAA Division III playoffs, but lost in the second round to Centre College (82–54).

In the 1980 Division III playoffs, the Tigers defeated UNC Greensboro in the first round (61–58) before losing to Lane College in the regional championships (87–70).

The 1980–81 Tigers won the SIAC Division III Championship and the NCAA South Regional Championship before finishing the season as the NCAA Division III South Quarterfinal runner-up. During this run they defeated the Rose-Hulman Institute of Technology in the first round (76–62), and Rhodes College in the regional championships (76–75) before losing an overtime game to Otterbein College in the quarterfinals (67– 64).

Division I
The school gained notoriety when they finished the 2004–05 season a winless 0–28, the first Division I team to do so since Prairie View A&M in 1991–92.

Horace Broadnax became the men's head basketball coach in 2005. In his sixth year as the head coach of the Tigers, the 2011–12 season, he was named the MEAC Coach of the Year as he guided the team to a 14–2 conference record and the school's first MEAC regular season title.

The Tigers were the 2011–12 MEAC regular season champions and received an automatic bid into the 2012 NIT, their first ever appearance in any Division I tournament as a Division I member. The team posted a 21–10 overall mark and lead the MEAC in scoring defense, only allowing 58.9 points per game and were second in the conference in scoring margin (+5.4).

The Tigers were ineligible for postseason play in the 2016–17 season due to APR violations. The Tigers were initially ruled to be ineligible for postseason play for a second consecutive season in 2017–18 due to APR violations. However, the NCAA granted the Tigers a waiver which would allow them to participate in postseason play.

On April 17, 2017, the school announced that it would return to Division II due to financial issues associated with competing in Division I. On December 7, 2017, the school announced it would rejoin Division II's SIAC, pending NCAA approval.

NCAA records

Savannah State set the NCAA records for fewest points in a half (4 points) and the worst field goal percentage in a half (4.3 percent) in an 85–25 loss to Kansas State on January 7, 2009. The Tigers completed the second half 1-for-23, breaking the shot-clock era record.

Postseason

NCAA Division II
The Tigers have appeared in the NCAA Division II Tournament once.

NCAA Division III
The Tigers have appeared in the NCAA Division III Tournament three times. Their combined record is 4–2.

NAIA tournament results
The Tigers have appeared in the NAIA Tournament three times. Their combined record is 2–3.

NIT results
The Tigers have appeared in the National Invitation Tournament (NIT) one time. Their record is 0–1.

CIT results
The Tigers have appeared in the CollegeInsider.com Postseason Tournament (CIT) two times. Their combined record is 0–2.

Season by season record

 Conference regular season Champions  Conference tournament champions  Conference Tournament and regular season champions

Notable alumni

Six Savannah State alumni became members of the Harlem Globetrotters:
Tyrone "Hollywood" Brown
Harold "Bobo" Hubbard
Matt "Showbiz" Jackson
Mike Jordan
Kevin Sutlon
Vincent White

References